Antti Ilari Törmänen (born September 19, 1970) is a retired professional ice hockey player and current head coach of EHC Biel in Switzerland's National League. He played for the Ottawa Senators, Jokerit, HV71 and Södertälje SK over 14 seasons.

Playing career
Törmänen had been playing professionally for Jokerit for four seasons when he was drafted in the 1994 NHL Entry Draft in the eleventh round, 274th overall by the Ottawa Senators of the NHL. After one more season with Jokerit, he signed with the Senators for the 1995–96 season. Törmänen played in 50 games for the Senators, and 22 games with the Prince Edward Island Senators. This was his only season in North America. After the season, he returned to Europe where he returned to Jokerit, and also played for HV71 Jönköping and Södertälje SK until retiring after the 2003–04 season. His best season statistically was 1993–94 with Jokerit where he scored 20 goals and 18 assists in 46 games.

As a player, he was nicknamed "Törminator".

Coaching career
Törmänen coached Espoo Blues U18 and U20 teams, winning U20 title in 2009. He then moved to Jokerit and was assistant coach of the team, before being sacked mid-season along with head coach Hannu Aravirta. In the 2010–11 season he was the head coach of Sport in Finland's second-tier Mestis, guiding the team to the title, while being named Mestis Coach of the Year.

He joined SC Bern of the Swiss National League A (NLA) as an assistant coach for the 2010–11 season and on October 21, 2011, he was promoted from assistant to head coach, replacing Larry Huras. He led SCB to the NLA title in 2013, but was sacked the following season after a stretch of nine losses in twelve games.

In April 2014, Törmänen agreed to become head coach of Finnish Liiga side HIFK. He parted ways with the club at the conclusion of the 2016–17 season. On December 11, 2017, he took over the head coaching job at EHC Biel in the Swiss National League.

On 15 March 2020, Törmänen tested positive for COVID-19. In July 2020 he was diagnosed with gallbladder cancer.

Career statistics

Regular season and playoffs

International

References

External links

1970 births
Living people
Espoo Blues players
Finnish ice hockey coaches
Finnish ice hockey left wingers
HV71 players
Ice hockey players at the 1998 Winter Olympics
Jokerit players
Medalists at the 1998 Winter Olympics
Olympic bronze medalists for Finland
Olympic ice hockey players of Finland
Olympic medalists in ice hockey
Ottawa Senators draft picks
Ottawa Senators players
Prince Edward Island Senators players
Södertälje SK players
Sportspeople from Espoo